Zorg en Hoop Airport  is an airport serving general aviation in the city of Paramaribo, Suriname.

The runway length includes a  displaced threshold on Runway 11. The airport is suitable for charters and regular services with smaller aircraft, and for helicopter flights. Connection is maintained from the airport for several smaller airports in the interior of Suriname, and for charter flights to the Caribbean. The only regular international service is to Georgetown, Guyana, with flights operated by Trans Guyana Airways and Gum Air with smaller propeller aircraft.

History  
In October 1952, the airport was put into use when Rudi Kappel and Herman van Eyck started a first Surinamese air company. The first flight was made with a Stinson Reliant airplane with registration PZ-TAA (MSN 77-167) of the company Kappel-van Eyck. In November 1952, this company built the first hangar at Zorg en Hoop airfield and added a second Stinson Reliant (PZ-TAB) to their fleet. In the summer of 1953, Zorg en Hoop Airport was used to develop many airstrips in the interior. The first mail delivery and passenger flights in Suriname were made from Zorg en Hoop to Moengo on 22 August 1953, and to Coronie on September 28th. Later also to Nickerie and Albina with the new Piper Cub (PZ-NAC) of Kappel-van Eyck named "Colibri".

Airlines and destinations

Charter flights are operated by Blue Wing Airlines and Gum Air for which this airport is their mainhub and homebase.

Other operators

See also
 List of airports in Suriname
 Transport in Suriname

References

External links
OpenStreetMap - Zorg en Hoop
OurAirports - Zorg en Hoop
SkyVector - Zorg en Hoop

Airports in Suriname
Buildings and structures in Paramaribo